Łukasz Perłowski (born 3 April 1984) is a Polish volleyball player, a member of Poland men's national volleyball team and Polish club PZL Sędziszów Małopolski, three–time Polish Champion (2012, 2013, 2015).

Personal life
He is married and has a daughter named Julia.

Career
In 2004 he joined Asseco Resovia Rzeszów. He has been playing for the club from Rzeszów for over 10 years. In his first seven years there, he won silver (2009) and two bronze medals of Polish Championship (2010, 2011). In the season 2013/2014 he won Polish SuperCup and silver medal of Polish Championship after losing matches with PGE Skra Bełchatów. In April 2015 he achieved  title of Polish Champion. In 2016 he left the club from Rzeszów and moved to 1st Polish league club Espadon Szczecin.

Sporting achievements
 CEV Champions League
  2014/2015 – with Asseco Resovia Rzeszów
 CEV Cup
  2011/2012 – with Asseco Resovia Rzeszów
 National championships
 2008/2009  Polish Championship, with Asseco Resovia Rzeszów
 2011/2012  Polish Championship, with Asseco Resovia Rzeszów
 2012/2013  Polish Championship, with Asseco Resovia Rzeszów
 2013/2014  Polish SuperCup, with Asseco Resovia Rzeszów
 2013/2014  Polish Championship, with Asseco Resovia Rzeszów
 2014/2015  Polish Championship, with Asseco Resovia Rzeszów
 2015/2016  Polish Championship, with Asseco Resovia Rzeszów

External links
 PlusLiga player profile
 

1984 births
Living people
People from Strzyżów County
Sportspeople from Podkarpackie Voivodeship
Polish men's volleyball players
Resovia (volleyball) players